Major General (Robert) Lamont Kirkland, CBE is a former senior British Army officer.  He commanded 4th Division from November 2008 to January 2012 and is now full-time CEO of Team Army.

Career
Following education at Strathallan School and training at Royal Military Academy Sandhurst, Kirkland's permanent commission in the Royal Engineers as a second lieutenant was confirmed on 9 October 1976 (dated 6 March 1976). He was promoted lieutenant on 6 March 1978, captain on 6 September 1982, and major on 30 September 1989.

He transferred to the Green Howards on 17 December 1991, and was promoted lieutenant colonel on appointment as Commanding Officer of the Green Howards on 30 June 1994. On 5 December 1997 he was appointed an Officer of the Order of the British Empire (OBE) for his service in the former Yugoslavia between December 1996 and June 1997. He was promoted colonel on 30 June 2000, and brigadier on 30 June 2003. In the 2005 New Year Honours he was promoted to Commander of the Order of the British Empire (CBE). In August 2008 he was serving as Director Army Personnel Strategy when he was nominated as the next General Officer Commanding of 4th Division. This appointment took effect on 12 November 2008 when he was also promoted major general. On 6 November 2008 he also became chairman of the Army Winter Sports Association (AWSA).

He left his military posts in January 2012 on his retirement from the Army and became full-time CEO of Team Army.

References 

Living people
Scottish generals
British Army major generals
Green Howards officers
Royal Engineers officers
Commanders of the Order of the British Empire
Year of birth missing (living people)
People educated at Strathallan School
Graduates of the Royal Military Academy Sandhurst
People from Ayr